Soltis is an Americanized spelling of Slavic surnames: Polish Sołtys.  Czech Šoltys, or Slovak Šoltýs. Notable people with the surname include:

 Andrew Soltis (born 1947), chess Grandmaster
 Douglas E. Soltis (born 1958), American botanist 
 Frank Soltis (born 1940), American computer scientist 
 Michael Soltis (born 1971), Canadian actor
 Pamela S. Soltis (born 1957), American botanist 
 Kristen Soltis Anderson

See also
Solti (surname)
Soltys (disambiguation)

References